The Second Council of Orange (or Second Synod of Orange) was held in 529 at Orange, which was then part of the Ostrogothic Kingdom. It affirmed much of the theology of Augustine of Hippo, and made numerous proclamations against what later would come to be known as semi-Pelagian doctrine.

Questions regarding Pelagianism

Background
Pelagian theology was condemned at the (non-ecumenical) 418 Council of Carthage, and these condemnations were ratified at the ecumenical Council of Ephesus in 431.  After that time, a more moderate form of Pelagianism persisted which claimed that man's faith was an act of free will unassisted by previous internal grace. On 3 July 529 a synod took place at Orange. The occasion was the dedication of a church built at Orange by Liberius (praetorian prefect) of Narbonensian Gaul.  It was attended by fourteen bishops under the presidency of Caesarius of Arles.

Bishops participating

Caesarius of Arles
Julianus Amartolus (Bishop of Carpentras)
Constantius (Bishop of Gap)
Cyprianus (Bishop of Toulon)
Eucherius (Bishop of Avignon)
Eucherius
Heraclius (Bishop of Saint-Paul-trois-Châteaux)
Principius
Philagrius (Bishop of Cavaillon)
Maximus
Praetextatus (Bishop of Apt)
Alethius (Bishop of Vaison)
Lupercianus (Bishop of Fréjus)
Vindemialis (Bishop of Orange)

Conclusions of the Council
The question at hand was whether a moderate form of Pelagianism could be affirmed, or if the doctrines of Augustine were to be affirmed. The determination of the council could be considered "semi-Augustinian". It defined that faith, though a free act of man, resulted, even in its beginnings, from the grace of God, enlightening the human mind and enabling belief. However, it also explicitly denied double predestination (of the equal-ultimacy variety), stating, "We not only do not believe that any are foreordained to evil by the power of God, but even state with utter abhorrence that if there are those who want to believe so evil a thing, they are anathema." The document links grace with baptism, which was not a controversial subject at the time. It received papal approbation under Pope Felix IV.

Effects
The canons of the Second Council seem to have been lost in the tenth century, then recovered and consequently published in 1543. Nonetheless, the teachings of the Council, which followed closely those of Augustine, continued to be adhered to by later medieval scholars, not least of which  Thomas Aquinas. The 'Capitula' of Felix IV, on which the Council's 'Capitula' were based, were freely used by the Council of Trent in its condemnation of Luther. Certain Classical Protestants affirm the theology of the Second Council of Orange. However, the concessions it makes of a weakened free will which cooperates with God's Grace is inconsistent with Luther (see Assertio, Article 36) or Calvin determinism and Calvin double-predestination. Arminian theologians also consider the Council of Orange historically significant in that it strongly affirmed the necessity of prevenient grace and yet did not present divine grace as irresistible, deny the free will of the unregenerate to repent in faith, or endorse a strictly Augustinian view of predestination.

References

Sources

Hefele, K. J.  Consiliengeschichte, ii. 291–295, 724 sqq., Eng. transl., iii. 159–184, iv. 152 sqq.

Mansi, J.-D. (ed.), Sacrorum Conciliorum nova et amplissima collectio editio novissima Tomus VIII (Florence 1762).
Sirmond, J., Concilia antiqua Gallia, i. 70 sqq., 215 sqq., Paris, 1829.

External links
Canons of the Second Council of Orange

529
6th century in Francia
6th-century church councils
Catholic Church councils held in France
Vaucluse
Ancient Christian controversies